Pierre Georges Louis Gaston d'Hugues (November 8, 1873 in Orléans – August 21, 1961 in Versailles) was a French fencer who competed in the early 20th century.

He participated in Fencing at the 1900 Summer Olympics in Paris and successfully fought his way through the preliminary heats, the quarter finals and the semi finals reaching the foil final. He finished in fifth place overall.

He also competed in fencing in the 1906 Intercalated Games in Athens, winning a gold medal in the team épée event and a bronze medal in the foil event.

Notes

References

External links
 
 

1873 births
1961 deaths
French male épée fencers
French male foil fencers
Olympic fencers of France
Fencers at the 1900 Summer Olympics
Fencers at the 1906 Intercalated Games
Olympic gold medalists for France
Olympic bronze medalists for France
Sportspeople from Orléans
Medalists at the 1906 Intercalated Games